The Grange railway line is a suburban branch line in Adelaide, South Australia.

History
In September 1882, a line was opened from Woodville to Grange, built by the Grange Railway and Investment Company. Unlike the Adelaide to Port Adelaide route, which was built and operated by the South Australian Government, the Grange line was a private venture, constructed to tap into potential development in the area between Woodville and the coast. The new line ran into a bay platform at Woodville. Although there was a connection to the main line, it was not possible for Grange line trains to conveniently continue to Adelaide.

The Grange railway company, with its rolling stock of two locomotives and four carriages, was not a financial success and was forced to operate on a shoestring budget right from the start. Following its collapse, the South Australian Railways took over operation in 1891, using a steam tram in place of the more conventional locomotive and carriages. The Grange line was fully bought out by the State Government in 1893, and in 1894 it was extended as the Henley Beach railway line from Grange southwards to Henley Beach along Military Road. Following modifications to the track layout at Woodville station in 1909, it became possible for trains from the Henley Beach and Grange branch lines to travel beyond Woodville to Adelaide.

In November 1940, a station at Hendon was opened; the line to the station diverged from the Grange line at Albert Park and ran  to the Hendon munitions works. After the end of World War II, the Hendon trains operated only at shift-change times. In spite of low passenger numbers, the service continued operation until 1 February 1980, after which the station was closed and the rail corridor repurposed as the eastern end of West Lakes Boulevard. The Grange line also serviced the former Cheltenham Racecourse station for Saturday horse racing events up until the 1960s.

The terminus at Grange was relocated in the late 1980s on the eastern side of Military Road to eliminate a level crossing. The old station was formerly a stop on the Henley Beach line, an extension of the Grange line which closed in 1957. A station named Holdens, located between Woodville and Albert Park stations adjacent to what is now the SA Manufacturing Park, was closed in 1992 and subsequently demolished. Until 1996, Grange line services previously operated as a shuttle from Woodville station at night and on weekends, connecting with Outer Harbor line services.

Renewal

The South Australian Government is considering electrifying the Outer Harbor line or converting it to light rail. A light rail conversion would also require the conversion or closure of the Grange line. A 2016 report into potential light rail projects in Adelaide considered four options for the future of the Grange line. The first option would electrify the heavy rail line but make no other changes, the second would convert the line to light rail and add a new on-street branch from Albert Park station to West Lakes, the third would retain the West Lakes route but replace the remaining section of the railway line with light rail along Grange Road and the final option would see the West Lakes line branch from the Grange Road light rail - completely replacing the railway line.

During 2–23 January 2017, the line was closed with the Outer Harbor line for the building of an overpass over South Road. During this time, tracks between Woodville station and Port Road were replaced, and Albert Park station was rebuilt. Both lines were closed again along with a portion of the Gawler line in April, June, July, and August of the same year to work on the Torrens Rail Junction Project; The entire line closed on September 24, and reopened on January 15, 2018.

Route
The line runs from the Adelaide to the seaside suburb of Grange. The route follows the same alignment as the Outer Harbor line as far as Woodville station, where it diverges south west and across Port Road. The route then travels through Albert Park and bisects the Royal Adelaide Golf Club between Seaton Park and East Grange stations. The line is single track from Woodville to Grange with no passing loops over its entire length. All stations on the line are unattended and have only very basic passenger waiting facilities.

Line guide

Services 
Services operate in tandem with Outer Harbor line trains. Weekday off-peak services run every 30 minutes, Weekday peak services run every 20–30 minutes with hourly services on weekends. When Royal Adelaide Golf Club hosted the South Australian Open services were temporarily cut back to Seaton Park for approximately two weeks. Rail replacement buses were used to transport passengers for the remainder of the route. The tournaments were cancelled in 2007. All services are operated by 3000 class railcars since 2014.

Gallery

References

External links
 Grange to City - Adelaide Metro website
 Route map SA Track & Signal

Railway lines in South Australia
Railway lines opened in 1882
Transport in Adelaide